The Ramphos Trident is an Italian amphibious ultralight trike, designed and produced by Ramphos of Fontanafredda. The aircraft is supplied as a kit for amateur construction or as a complete ready-to-fly-aircraft.

Design and development
The Trident features a strut-braced hang glider-style high-wing, weight-shift controls, a two-seats-in-tandem open cockpit with a rigid boat hull, retractable tricycle landing gear and a single engine in pusher configuration.

The aircraft is made from bolted-together aluminum tubing, with its double surface wing covered in Dacron sailcloth and its boat hull made from either fibreglass or carbon fibre and Kevlar. Its  span Hazard wing has struts and uses an "A" frame weight-shift control bar. The powerplant is a twin cylinder, liquid-cooled, two-stroke, dual-ignition  Rotax 582 engine or a four-cylinder, air and liquid-cooled, four-stroke, dual-ignition  Rotax 912UL engine or a  converted Smart Car four stroke turbocharged engine. All engines are fitted with a clutch that stops the propeller from turning when the engine is at idle to permit water handling. The boat hull features a water rudder.

Starting in 2005 the frame and wing portion of the aircraft was taken from the Skyrider Sonic ultralight trike, built by Skyrider Flugschule.

Variants
Hydro
Initial flying boat model that lacks wheeled landing gear. Introduced in 1998 and in production in 2013.
Trident
Amphibious model with fibreglass boat hull, in production in 2013.
C
Amphibious model with carbon fibre/Kevlar boat hull and lexan windows in the bottom of the hull to allow visibility downwards. In production in 2013.

Specifications (Trident)

References

External links

1990s Italian sport aircraft
1990s Italian ultralight aircraft
Single-engined pusher aircraft
Ultralight trikes
Homebuilt aircraft